Robert Burnham Jr. (June 16, 1931 – March 20, 1993) was an American astronomer, best known for writing the classic three-volume Burnham's Celestial Handbook. He is the discoverer of numerous asteroids including the Mars crossing asteroid 3397 Leyla, as well as six comets.

Burnham's late years were tragic; he died destitute and alone. However, he is remembered by a generation of deep sky observers for his unique contribution to astronomy, the Celestial Handbook. The main-belt  asteroid 3467 Bernheim was named in his honor.

Early life and career

Burnham was born in Chicago, Illinois, in 1931, the son of Robert Sr. and Lydia. His family moved to Prescott, Arizona, in 1940, and he graduated from high school there in 1949. That was the culmination of his formal education. Always a shy person, he had few friends, never married, and spent most of his time observing with his home-built telescope.

In the fall of 1957 he received considerable local publicity when he discovered his first comet. This led to his being hired by Lowell Observatory in Flagstaff, Arizona, in 1958 to work on a survey of stellar proper motion using a blink comparator. While Burnham was working at Lowell, he and his co-worker, Norman G. Thomas, discovered five more comets (including 56P/Slaughter-Burnham), and in excess of 1500 asteroids.

Burnham's Celestial Handbook

In addition to his regular duties at the observatory, Burnham spent almost all of his free time working on the Celestial Handbook. His writing and his book were never officially supported by Lowell Observatory.

Subtitled "An Observer's Guide to the Universe Beyond the Solar System," the Celestial Handbook combines a lengthy introduction to astronomy with catalog information for every constellation in the sky. Thousands of stars and deep sky objects visible in small telescopes are covered in meticulous detail.

Originally self-published in a loose-leaf serial format beginning in 1966, and with a revised edition by Dover Publications in 1978, the Celestial Handbook was well reviewed in amateur astronomy magazines and became a best seller in this specialized field. It is still in-print and is considered to be a classic in the literature of amateur astronomy.

Due to the popularity of Celestial Handbook, Tony Ortega writing in the Phoenix New Times in 1997 described Burnham as an author "whose name has become so familiar to some readers it has become a sort of shorthand, like Audubon to birders, Hoyle to card players, Webster to poor spellers, Robert to parliamentarians." Ortega then described the book series as:

Burnham and spectra of planetary nebulae:
For the modern observer, a considerable number of interesting planetary nebulae are within range of a good amateur instrument, ranging from tiny stellar-appearing objects up to great phantom rings such as NGC 7293 in Aquarius. To identify the more stellar planetaries, the interested observer may experiment with a simple technique that impressively demonstrates their peculiar radiation: merely obtain a small piece of replica diffraction grating and place this between the eyepiece and the observer's eye. Seen in this way, all the images of stars will be drawn out into narrow colored streaks, but a planetary nebula will appear as a series of discrete individual images, each one indicating a definite wavelength in which the object is radiating. The observer should try this unusual technique on some of the smaller and brighter planetaries, such as NGC 6572 in Ophiuchus or NGC 6210 in Hercules, before attempting to identify more distant nearly stellar examples.

The color contrast of Albireo (β Cygni):
Albireo is one of the most beautiful double stars in the sky, considered by many observers to be the finest in the heavens for the small telescope. The brighter star is a golden yellow or "topaz", magnitude 3.09, spectrum K3; the "sapphire" companion is magnitude 5.11, spectrum B8 V. The separation is 34.3", an easy object for the low power telescope. Even a pair of good binoculars, if steadily held will split the pair. Albireo is noted for its superb color contrast, best seen with the eyepiece slightly displaced from the sharpest focus. Miss Agnes Clerke (1905) called the tints "golden and azure", giving perhaps "the most lovely effect of color in the heavens". For the average amateur telescope there is probably no pair so attractive, though the color effect seems to diminish in either very small or very large telescopes, or with too high a magnification. No more than 30X is required on a good 6-inch to show this superb pair as two contrasting jewels suspended against a background of glittering star-dust. The surrounding region is wonderfully rich, and for wide-angle telescopes the star clouds to the northeast are probably unequalled in splendor in the entire heavens.

Messier 22:
Messier 22 is one of the closest globulars to the galactic plane. It also lies less than a degree from the ecliptic, so astrophotographers will occasionally have an opportunity to record a bright planet in the field with the cluster; the planet Mercury, for example, passed through the field on december 12, 1977; Venus was in nearly the same position in early january, 1978. Such events are not always mentioned in astronomical publications, so the observer must make his own predictions by periodically checking planetary positions in the Nautical Almanac.

Burnham and sabi:
The indefinable mood which the Japanese call sabi, for which there is no exact English equivalent, but which might be roughly defined as that direct inward perception by which we find deep significance or great artistic quality in some outwardly simple and unpretentious object. A diamond bracelet from Tiffany's for example, might contain no sabi, while a woodcarving by a simple uneducated fisherman might be packed to the (ahem) gills with it.

Burnham, the Pleiades, and Devil's Tower:
In American Indian legend the Pleiades are connected with the Mateo Tepe or Devil's Tower, that curious and wonderfully impressive rock formation which rises like a colossal petrified tree-stump to a height of 1300 feet above the plains of northeastern Wyoming. According to the lore of the Kiowa, the Tower was raised up by the Great Spirit to protect seven Indian maidens who were pursued by giant bears; the maidens were afterwards placed in the sky as the Pleiades cluster, and the marks of the bears' claws may be seen in the vertical striations on the sides of the Tower unto this day. The Cheyenne had a similar legend.

Burnham also mentions the spinthariscope.

Life after Lowell

In April 1979, the year after Celestial Handbook was published by Dover, Burnham received notice that the proper motion survey would soon be completed and that the observatory could not afford to keep him on in the position he had long held. Despite months of warning, he failed to make other arrangements and, after twenty-one years at Lowell, his job ended in December of that year. Unwilling to take the only position that was offered to him, that of janitor at the observatory, he left.

Burnham was never able to recover personally, professionally, or financially after he lost the job at Lowell. Over the next few years, while sales of the Celestial Handbook were rapidly growing, Burnham's personal circumstances were steadily worsening. His shyness increased and he shunned all publicity, becoming even more reclusive. He bickered often with Dover about royalties and about the creation of possible new editions or translations of his book. He also worked sporadically on a fantasy novel – which he never completed.

Writing for the Frosty Drew Observatory in 2000, Doug Stewart  said:

As his situation worsened, Burnham, who was never married, become bitter and depressed, and isolated himself from his few friends and family. He had lived for a time in Phoenix, Arizona, but in May 1986 he left Phoenix and dropped out of sight completely, informing no one but his publisher of his whereabouts. Despite being the author of a successful book, Burnham spent the last years of his life in poverty and obscurity in San Diego, California, selling his paintings of cats at Balboa Park. The fans of Celestial Handbook were likely unaware of his personal circumstances; possibly assuming that a different and unrelated Robert Burnham, an editor at Astronomy magazine, was the author.

Naming of 3467 Bernheim
Norm Thomas, Burnham's former co-worker at Lowell Observatory, had told Burnham that he planned to name an asteroid after him. On September 26, 1981, Thomas discovered a main belt asteroid, but since asteroid 834 Burnhamia, named after the unrelated 19th century astronomer Sherburne Wesley Burnham, already carried the name,  a different spelling was needed. Thomas chose the spelling Bernheim, for the Burnham family's ancestral Bohemian surname. Thus the asteroid named to honor Robert Burnham Jr. was named 3467 Bernheim.

Death and posthumous "interview"

Burnham died destitute and alone at the age of sixty-one in 1993. His family did not learn about his death (apparently by his choice) until two years later, and didn't report it to the press even then because they were unaware of his stature in the amateur astronomy community.

After his death, it was realized that he had often attended programs presented by the San Diego Astronomy Association (at the Ruben H. Fleet Space Theater in Balboa Park) without anyone recognizing him. In spite of the tragedy of his later years, Burnham continues to be remembered by a generation of deep sky observers for his unique Celestial Handbook. His cremated remains are interred at the Fort Rosecrans National Cemetery in San Diego, California.

In 2009 a memorial consisting of a small bronze plaque resembling a page in Burnham's Celestial Handbook was installed on the Pluto Walk at Lowell Observatory.

Burnham rarely gave interviews, but at the height of the popularity of Handbook in 1982, he wrote a piece where he playfully interviewed himself for the magazine Astronomy. A much longer version of this essay, An Interview with the author of The Celestial Handbook, dated April 1983, was discovered among Burnham's papers and it was first published in its entirety by The Village Voice in June 2011, 18 years after his death. It was introduced as follows:

Bibliography
Burnham's Celestial Handbook was originally self-published in a loose-leaf serial format beginning in 1966; it was issued in hardcover and later as a paperback in a three-volume, revised and enlarged edition by Dover Publications beginning in 1978.

References

External links
 Tom and Jennifer Polakis, "The Robert Burnham Jr. Memorial at Lowell Observatory"
 Photo of Burnham
 
 Tony Ortega,    "Sky Writer: The cosmic life of ‘Celestial Handbook’ author Robert Burnham Jr."

1931 births
1993 deaths
20th-century American  astronomers
Discoverers of asteroids
Discoverers of comets
People from Prescott, Arizona
Burials at Fort Rosecrans National Cemetery